A Jolly Good Fellow may refer to:

 A Jolly Good Fellow, pseudonym used by Dutch music producer Ferry Corsten
 A Jolly Good Fellow (novel), a 2008 novel by American author Stephen V. Masse